The Art of Not Being Governed: An Anarchist History of Upland Southeast Asia is a book-length anthropological and historical study of the Zomia highlands of Southeast Asia written by James C. Scott published in 2009. Zomia, as defined by Scott, includes all the lands at elevations above 300 meters stretching from the Central Highlands of Vietnam to Northeastern India. That encompasses parts of Vietnam, Cambodia, Laos, Thailand, and Myanmar, as well as four provinces of China. Zomia's 100 million residents are minority peoples "of truly bewildering ethnic and linguistic variety", he writes. Among them are the Akha, Hmong, Karen, Lahu, Mien, and Wa peoples.

Argument
For two thousand years, the disparate groups that now reside in Zomia (a mountainous region the size of Europe—2.5 million km2—that consists of portions of seven Asian countries) have fled the projects—slavery, conscription, taxes, corvée, epidemics, and warfare—of the nation state societies that surround them. This book, essentially an "anarchist history", is the first examination of the huge literature on nation-building whose author evaluates why people would deliberately choose to remain stateless.

Scott's main argument is that these people are "barbaric by design": their social organization, geographical location, subsistence practices and culture have been maintained to discourage states from curtailing their freedoms. States want to integrate Zomia peoples and territory to increase their landholdings, resources, and people subject to taxation—in other words, to raise revenue. Scott argues that these many minority groups are "...using their culture, farming practices, egalitarian political structures, prophet-led rebellions, and even their lack of writing systems to put distance between themselves and the states that wished to engulf them." Tribes today do not live outside history according to Scott, but have "as much history as they require" and deliberately practice "state avoidance".

Scott admits to making "bold claims" in his book, but credits many other scholars, including the French anthropologist Pierre Clastres and the American historian Owen Lattimore, as influences.

See also
Anarchy#Lists of ungoverned communities
Stateless society
Mainland Southeast Asia linguistic area
Southeast Asian Massif

References

Reviews

External links
The Art of Not Being Governed: An Anarchist History of Upland Southeast Asia review by Foreign Affairs
History of people without history review by The Hindu
The Art of Not Being Governed: An Anarchist History of Upland Southeast Asia review by The Independent Institute
Life on the Edge review by Reason
The Art of Not Being Governed: An Anarchist History of Upland Southeast Asia review by Reviews in History
The Art of Not Being Governed: An Anarchist History of Upland Southeast Asia review in Journal of Folklore Research Reviews 

2009 non-fiction books
Anthropology books
Books about Asia
History books about anarchism
Southeast Asia